Aham is a municipality in the district of Landshut in Bavaria in Germany. It lies on the river Vils.

References

Landshut (district)